Sohaib Khan (born 1 July 1989) is a Pakistani first-class cricketer who plays for Karachi.

References

External links
 

1989 births
Living people
Pakistani cricketers
Karachi cricketers
Cricketers from Karachi